The Burgundian language may refer to:

 Sometimes the  dialect is referred to as part of the Burgundian group
 Burgundian language (Germanic), the extinct East Germanic language of the Burgundians